Peter M. Douglas (August 22, 1942 – April 1, 2012) was an environmental activist, UCLA law graduate, and principal author of Proposition 20, an initiative in 1972 that created the California Coastal Commission. He served as its Executive Director for 26 years. He was also co-author of the 1976 Coastal Act.

Early life

Douglas was born Peter Michael Ehlers in Berlin on August 22, 1942. At the age of two his family's home was destroyed by Allied planes during the bombing of Berlin. After WWII he immigrated to the United States in 1950 with his mother and sister, and changed his last name upon becoming an American citizen.  

As a young man he enjoyed surfing off Redondo Beach and camping in the desert and mountains of Southern California.

He studied in California and Germany. He earned an undergraduate degree in psychology and a graduate degree in law at UCLA, where he focused on antiwar and social justice movements and co-founded a law collective. He also studied abroad for one year in Germany. After completing his law degree in 1969, he and his German-born wife, Rotraut, then moved abroad for a few years. He was not yet focused on environmentalism.

Career

He returned to the U.S. in 1971 and accepted a job in Sacramento on the staff of then-Assemblyman Alan Sieroty, a Democrat from Los Angeles, who put him in charge of writing laws protecting the state's coastline.

He was the main author of laws Proposition 20 in 1972 and the 1976 Coastal Act, which created and made permanent the California Coastal Commission. Later for 26 years he was executive director of the Commission, the regulatory agency he helped create.

He fought the development of homes, industry, and infrastructure in California. He considered among the Commission’s most significant achievements defeating a proposed toll road skirting San Onofre State Beach, a liquefied natural gas terminal off the Ventura County coast and the development of Hearst Ranch. He considered the decision to allow housing subdivisions along the Bolsa Chica wetlands one of its worst failures. Douglas's work helped keep one of the world’s most beautiful coastlines largely undeveloped.

In 2006, two years after recovering from Stage 4 cancer,  Douglas told the New York Times he set a match to a pile of dead leaves he had poured gasoline onto, igniting an explosion that sent him flying. He recovered from the serious burns that resulted.

Death
Douglas died of lung and throat cancer on April 1, 2012 at the home of his sister in La Quinta, California. As his cancer progressed, he wrote of his beliefs about life and death in lengthy, highly philosophical emails to friends. He halted mainstream Western medical treatment in favor of Eastern therapies, abandoned his strict vegan diet and wound up outliving his doctors' prognoses by many months.

References

Further reading

1942 births
2012 deaths
American environmentalists
American people of German descent
American conservationists
University of California, Los Angeles alumni